The Law of the People's Republic of China on Safeguarding National Security in the Hong Kong Special Administrative Region (Hong Kong National Security Law, National Security Law, or NSL) came into effect on 30 June 2020 after the imposition by the Chinese Government. Since then, over 240 individuals have been arrested, some of whom are facing charges under the law and some have been sentenced to jail. In October 2022, John Lee, the newly installed Hong Kong Chief Executive, made his first policy address regarding the law, and indicated that his administration intends to tighten control.

The list below shows cases concerning Hong Kong National Security, including those arrested or charged under the NSL, and other cases involving the operation of the National Security Department of the Hong Kong Police Force (National Security Department, NSD) in spite of non-NSL suspected crimes.

National Security offences 
There are a total of four categories of offences under Chapter III of the National Security Law: secession, subversion, terrorist activities, collusion, with all carrying a maximum penalty of life imprisonment. All four offences have already been used to charge Hong Kong residents in various cases. Below are extracts from the law defining the four offences.

Secession

Subversion

Terrorist activities

Collusion

Related offences

Failing to provide information 
In addition to the above mentioned four crimes listed in the national security law, the Article 43 of the law empowers the Hong Kong Chief Executive to enact additional rules for applying measures when the Hong Kong Police Force is handling cases concerning offence endangering national security.

Under the Implementation Rules for Article 43, multiple offences are listed, including contravening order to freeze property, or disclose offence-related properties, or remove electronic message on the electronic platform, or furnish information, or produce material, etc. The only case charged under the Implementation Rules for Article 43 is against the Hong Kong Alliance for failing to provide information under section 3(3)(b) of Schedule 5 of the Implementation Rules.

Sedition 
The Crimes Ordinance, first enacted in November 1971 during British colonial rule, involves crimes of "treason" and "other offences against the Crown", which were not used after 1967 leftists riots but until the NSL came into effect. Despite not listed under the NSL, Hong Kong Court of Final Appeal ruled in December 2021 that the aforementioned crimes under the Crimes Ordinance are offences endangering National Security, and that the stringent bail threshold may be applied to these crimes. 

It shall be noted that, according to Interpretation and General Clauses Ordinance, "any reference in any provision to Her Majesty, the Crown, the British Government or the Secretary of State (or to similar names, terms or expressions) [...] shall be construed as a reference to the Government of the Hong Kong Special Administrative Region."

Judicial procedures and controversies 
According to criminal procedure in Hong Kong, Hong Kong Police must decide whether to charge, to grant bail, or to unconditionally release the arrested individual. Defendants facing charges would be taken to court where they can submit bail application to judges. Nevertheless, under the Article 42 of the NSL, "[no] bail shall be granted to a criminal suspect or defendant unless the judge has sufficient grounds for believing that the criminal suspect or defendant will not continue to commit acts endangering national security". Hence majority of defendants were denied bail under the unprecedented strict threshold, while the minority with bail granted were required to follow a long list of requirements.

Under the Article 44, "[t]he Chief Executive shall designate a number of judges [...] to handle cases concerning offence endangering national security." The complete list of designated judges is not made available to the public as the government believes such revelation poses security threats to the designated judges. However, from open court sessions, a list of designated national security law judges has been produced.

Under the Article 46, "the Secretary for Justice may issue a certificate directing that the case shall be tried without a jury", instead "be tried in the Court of First Instance without a jury by a panel of three judges." Four cases were or are tried without a jury in High Court : trial of Tong Ying-kit, Hong Kong 47, Apple Daily, Hong Kong Alliance.

Prosecutors 
The US Congressional-Executive Commission on China (CECC) has twice called on the US government to sanction prosecutors and team members who represent the Hong Kong government in national security cases:

Statistics 
As of March 2023, at least 207 were arrested for endangering national security, 125 of those faced charges.

Repeated counting involved as Tong Ying-kit convicted of both secession, terrorism; Kwok Man-hei convicted of subversion and tried for terrorism; Chow Hang-tung convicted of failing to provide information and tried for subversion. Bracketed numbers refer to numbers of individuals involved, with convicted bolded.

2020 cases

Handover protest (1 July 2020) 

Thousands of protesters gathered on Hong Kong Island on 1 July 2020, the twenty-third anniversary of the handover of Hong Kong, in opposition to the NSL which had come into effect in the late evening of the previous day. The 1 July march was banned by the police for the first time.

The first arrest for an alleged breach of the national security law was made by police in Causeway Bay, where a man had been found to be in possession of a Hong Kong independence flag. On one photo posted by police on Twitter, he was seen wearing a black T-shirt with the words "Free Hong Kong" written on it. Netizens found that in a photo, two barely visible words, "no to", were written in front of the printed words "Hong Kong independence". A girl aged 15 was arrested for waving a pro-independence banner. Police said that 10 of the arrests made were for national security related offences.

Tong Ying-kit 
In the afternoon of 1 July 2020, Tong Ying-kit, aged 23, drove a motorcycle with the flag "Liberate Hong Kong, revolution of our times" past several police checkpoints towards police in Wan Chai, injuring three officers; the officers were briefly hospitalized, but were found to have suffered no injuries more serious than a thumb dislocation. Tong was arrested at the scene, and was the only one charged among the 10 arrested under the NSL on that day.

Charged with "committing incitement to secession" (Article 20 and 21 of NSL) and "terrorist activities" (Article 24 of NSL) on 3 July, Tong became the first defendant under the new law. He was repeatedly denied bail. Secretary of Justice Teresa Cheng informed Tong on 5 February 2021 that his case would be tried without a jury, instead by three NSL-designated judges. Tong challenged Cheng's decision but was rejected by the Court of Appeal on 22 June 2021.

The trial began on 23 June 2021, nearly a year after the incident. Tong pleaded not guilty to all charges, including a new, alternative charge for terrorism of "dangerous driving causing grievous bodily harm", which can lead to up to seven years in prison. The question of whether the "Liberate Hong Kong" slogan had a separatist connotation was considered by some observers as being at the center of the case, taking up a full week of debate during the 15-day trial. The judges did not deliver a clear-cut verdict on it, saying that the deciding factor was the intent of the one who used the slogan.

The High Court found Tong guilty on 27 July, and sentenced him to a total of 9 years in prison on 30 July, of which secession and terrorist activities carried 6.5 and 8 years of imprisonment respectively after part of them would be served concurrently. Tong appealed the verdict and sentencing according to the lead defence lawyer, but withdrew the appeal for unspecified reasons, reportedly by writing a letter from prison, in the last months of 2021.

Yuen Long attack anniversary (21 July 2020) 

On 21 July 2020, a year after the Yuen Long attack, citizens gathered in Yoho Mall chanting slogans. Kwai Tsing District Councillor Rayman Chow Wai-hung was arrested after police suspected him breaching the NSL by inciting secession for holding up the slogan "Liberate Hong Kong, revolution of our time", but released on bail and not charged.

Studentlocalism (29 July 2020) 

Studentlocalism, a pro-independence Hong Kong student activist group, dissolved its Hong Kong headquarter hours before the NSL was imposed, announcing that it intended to continue its operations from Taiwan, Australia and the US. Despite so, Tony Chung, co-founder and last convenor of the group, along with former spokesman Ho Nok-hang, former members Yanni Ho and William Chan, were arrested on 29 July 2020 on suspicion of breaching the NSL through inciting secession. Senior superintendent Steve Li said the same day that the arrests were based on the content on social media accounts, which he did not specify but were speculated to be those of the "Inititative Independence Party". That group itself claimed to have been founded by former members based overseas. Chung was said by the prosecution, Ivan Cheung, to be the administrator of the Inititative Independence Party and of the Facebook page of the U.S. branch of Studentlocalism. it also accused him of having violated the NSL after it came into force. The four were granted bail two days later; Chung was asked to delete posts on social media and claimed to have had a saliva sample taken by police.

Tony Chung, Yanni Ho and William Chan were arrested again for inciting secession on 27 October 2020, after Chung had reportedly been denied entry to the U.S. Consulate General for asylum. Tim Luk, a former member of the group, was also arrested for assisting fugitives on 9 November 2020. Ho Nok-hang, Yanni Ho and Chan were unconditionally released, marking the first such instances since the NSL had come into force, and had their passports returned on 18 January 2021.

Chung was formally charged with secession, money laundering, and conspiracy to publish seditious materials. He was the second individual facing charges under the NSL, denied bail, and ordered to remain in custody until his next appearance in court on 7 January 2021. While remanded in custody, Chung was sentenced to four months in jail for desecrating the PRC national flaga charge which he had denied, arguing that he had been unaware that it was a PRC national flagand unlawful assembly. Chung was given 43-month jail sentence on 23 November 2021 for secession and money laundering.

Apple Daily (10 August 2020)

First crackdown 

Executives of Next Digital, the parent company of pro-democracy newspaper Apple Daily, were arrested on 10 August 2020 and the offices of the newspaper were raided by over 100police officers on the same day. Founder of Next Digital Jimmy Lai and his two sons, Timothy and Ian, were arrested along with CEO Cheung Kim-hung, CFO Royston Chow, administrative director Wong Wai-keung, and animation director Kith Ng. Lai and his sons were arrested for suspected collusion with foreign forces under the NSL, while the four senior executives were arrested for suspected collusion with foreign and external forces as well as conspiracy to defraud. Jimmy Lai's private secretary Mark Simon, a foreign national, was reportedly wanted under the law. Lai was accused of financing groups advocating sanctions against Hong Kong, although police did not immediately name the group or the media company involved. He and the executives were released on bail.

On 2 December 2020, Lai was arrested again and formally charged with fraud the next day. He was denied bail by court and remanded in custody. While waiting for the bail hearing, Lai was charged again for colluding with foreign forces on 11 December.

Lai was allowed to leave from custody on 23 December by court. The Department of Justice (DOJ) of the Government immediately appealed to the top court, while pro-Beijing media and government mouthpieces strongly criticised the decision of letting Lai leaving the detention centre. Lai, on 31 December, was sent to jail again after the court decided to consider the appeal, and the government won on 9 February 2021. A subsequent bail application by Lai was denied on 19 February. He faced additional charges and was jailed, together with other democracy activists, on 16 April 2021 to 14 months in prison for his participation in protests on 18 and 31 August 2019. On 10 December 2022, Lai was sentenced in the fraud case on two charges to five years and nine months in jail and fined  (HKD), while Wong Wai-keung was jailed on one fraud charge to 21 months.

Stephen Ting, former executive director at Next Digital, was arrested on 2 March 2021 by the NSD, accused of fraud, and was released on bail.

Second crackdown 

Next Digital was reraided on 17 June 2021 and five senior Apple Daily staff arrested at their homes at around 7:00 a.m. on suspicion of collusion with foreign forces: chief executive officer Cheung Kim-hung; chief operating officer Royston Chow Tat-kuen; deputy chief editor Chan Pui-man; editor-in-chief Ryan Law Wai-kwong; and chief executive editor Nick Cheung Chi-wai. The police froze assets of three Apple Daily companies (Apple Daily Limited, Apple Daily Printing Limited, and AD Internet Limited) to the amount of 18million HKD, and accused the media outlet of endangering national security through several articles urging foreign sanctions against Hong Kong and China; police demanded the removal of these articles. Cheung Kim-hung, Law Wai-kwong, and the three Apple Daily companies were formally charged with collusion, marking the first time news media and companies faced national security charges. Bails for Cheung and Law were denied on 19 June, while the three other senior executives had been granted bail the evening before. Apple Daily opinion writer Yeung Ching-kee (or Yeung Ching-Kei), known under the pen name Li Ping, was arrested on 23 June 2021 and later bailed out, also accused of collusion with foreign forces.

Apple Daily cited an increasingly risky environment and limited financial resources as reasons to cease publication with its 24 June 2021 issue. All social media accounts and its website vanished after midnight on 23 June. Editorial writer Fung Wai-kong was arrested at the airport on 27 June en route to Britain; this was the seventh arrest of an Apple Daily staff in the crackdown. Chan, Fung, Yeung, and Lam Man-chung, former executive editor-in-chief of Apple Daily, were arrested on 21 July 2021the former three having their bail granted the previous month revokedand formally charged with collusion. All defendants on 28 December 2021 faced the new charge of sedition, specifically the distribution of "seditious publications" in the period from April 2019 to 24 June 2021. Chan Pui-man was arrested for the third time and jailed the next day in relation to the Stand News case. The trial of this case became the third national security cases to proceed without a jury.

Following the cease of operations and the arrest of executives, Next Digital was liquidated on 15 December 2021 after a petition filed under Companies Ordinance by the Financial Secretary, Paul Chan Mo-po.

Stand with Hong Kong (10 August 2020) 

In the course of investigations connected to Jimmy Lai Chee-ying, a group advocating for foreign countries to impose sanctions on Hong Kong was found by the NSD department of the police to have received, as per non-police sources reported by media, around 10million HKD. Sources also said that the group in question was called "Fight for Freedom, Stand with Hong Kong", founded by Finn Lau, an activist exiled to the United Kingdom. Police said it had arrested six members of the group on 10 August 2020; two of them were Wilson Li Chung-chak and Andy Li Yu-hin. Lau was added to the police wanted list, along with Lai's right hand man Mark Simon, and US-based Samuel Chu.

The Lis were granted bail two days later, but Andy Li was arrested again by Chinese authorities for his failed attempt fleeing to Taiwan, which became known as "the case of 12 Hongkongers". While Li was serving the 7-month sentence handed in China on 30 December 2020, Chan Tsz-wah, his assistant, was arrested on 15 February 2021 by Hong Kong police for collusion and assisting an offender, and had his bail denied later.

Following the release on 22 March 2021, Andy Li was sent back to Hong Kong and later charged with collusion, conspiracy to assist offenders, and possessing ammunition without a license. Both Li and Chan pleaded guilty to collusion with foreign forces on 19 August 2021, specifically through conspiring with Jimmy Lai, Mark Simon, and Finn Lau. They recognised Lai and Simon as the "masterminds" of the conspiracy that initially sought intervention in Hong Kong over police brutality during the 2019 protests and later expanded its scope to lobby for foreign sanctions on Hong Kong or China.

Agnes Chow (10 August 2020) 

Agnes Chow Ting, a core member of the dissolved localism political party Demosisto, was also arrested on 10 August, accused of collusion. Chow was granted bail a day later, but was charged with unlawful assembly on 30 August 2019 for her participation in the siege by thousands of protesters of Wan Chai police headquarters on 21 June 2019. Pleading guilty, she was jailed for 10 months in December 2020. She was released after serving seven months on 12 June 2021, with no reason for her early release being immediately given.

Adam Ma (15 August 2020) 
Adam Ma Chun-man, nicknamed "Captain America 2.0" for his costumes, is an activist who frequently chanted and displayed pro-independence slogans in various protests. He had been arrested multiple times for chanting slogansbeing remanded in prison from November 2020 and was charged with one count of secession; he was accused of chanting slogans, and calling for Hong Kong independence in speeches, on at least 20 public occasions between August and November 2020. Ma was not granted bail, and was found guilty on 25 October 2021 after a four-day trial. Ma was sentenced to jail for five years and nine months on 11 November 2021. On 3 August 2022, after an appeal by Ma, his sentence was reduced to five years. This marked the first time that a conviction under the national security law had been successfully challenged.

Dragon Slaying Brigade (5 September 2020) 
"Dragon Slaying Brigade" is a group planning to injure or kill police officers, in revenge to the crackdown on protestors.

Lai Chun-pong was arrested by the NSD on 5 September 2020 for "conspiracy with intent to injure police officers" in 2019, a non-national security offence. According to court documents, Lai and eight others, including three that failed fleeing to Taiwan, were accused of plotting a bomb attack to "slaughter" police during an anti-government protest on 8 December 2019. Eventually the case had a total of 13 defendants, some related to protests on 8 December 2019, and to a shooting incident on 20 December 2019.

Ng Wing-tak, a 34-year-old co-founder of online media outlet PPPN International, was arrested by the NSD on 1 October 2020 for conspiracy to injure police officer with intent in December 2019, suspected in connection with the "Dragon Slaying Brigade". Ng was released on bail.

Tam Tak-chi (6 September 2020) 

Tam Tak-chi, nicknamed "Fast Beat", was the vice-chairman of the pro-democracy political party People Power. He was arrested by the NSD at his residence in Tai Po on 6 September 2020, and charged with "uttering seditious words" and disorderly conduct in public. He was denied bail on 17September. On 3 December, a NSL judge was assigned to the sedition case, meeting a request by prosecution that was based on their argument that the slogans Tam had chanted, including "Liberate Hong Kong, revolution of our times", were subversive. As of that date, Tam faced a total of 14 charges, including for uttering seditious words, inciting others to knowingly take part in an unauthorised assembly, and holding an unauthorised assembly.  
The chief district judge had announced the appointment of an NSL judge for the case the previous day, saying this was to avoid any potential legal challenges based on ultra vires if a ruling in favour of the prosecution was to eventuate.

It is reported that a female was arrested on the same day for shouting pro-independence slogans using a megaphone, accused of breaching the NSL. She was released on police bail.

Tam was found guilty of 11 out of 13 charges on 2 March 2022. He was sentenced to jail for 40 months on 20 April.

Lui Sai-yu (24 September 2020) 
Lui Sai-yu, a first year student at Hong Kong Polytechnic University who had joined the 2019 protests, was arrested on 24 September 2020 in Fanling along with his 49-year-old mother. Lui was charged with: possession of arms without licence, import of strategic commodities without licence, possession of offensive weapon; while his mother was bailed out by police. After dropping the alleged weapons offence, prosecutors charged Lui with inciting secession in April 2021 for spreading independence slogans, and with possession of offensive weapons with intent. Lui later agreed to plead guilty to the National Security offences but not to the offensive weapons charge.

Two more were arrested by the NSD on 30 April 2021, likely to be in connection with this case. The 28-year-old male was arrested for inciting secession while the 22-year-old female for dealing in arms without licence. Both were not charged.

On 27 April 2022, Lui pleaded guilty to the charge of selling weapons on Telegram and posting pro-independence messages. On 29 April, he was sentenced to five years in jail. Judge Amanda Woodcock had initially handed a sentence of three years and eight months, but persecution successfully appealed to the court to reconsider based on the minimum sentence of five years stipulated by the NSL for offences of a serious nature. Lui had not received bail. He appealed the verdict in July, but was rejected by the Court of Appeal on 30 November. In February 2023 it transpired that Lui had launched another bid to have his sentence reduced, at the Court of Final Appeal.

12 Hongkongers (10 October 2020) 

Nine people, four men and five women, were arrested by the Organised Crime and Triad Bureau of the Police Force on 10 October 2020 for allegedly assisting the attempted border-crossing of the 12 Hongkongers. Police also seized 500,000Hong Kong dollars in cash, computers, mobile phones, and documents indicative of the purchase of a boat.

On 14 January 2021, 11 more were arrested by the NSD in connection with the case, including: Daniel Wong, Kowloon City District Councillor; Rono Fok, musician; Cheung Ching-yan, mother of Willis Ho, ex-Secretary General of Hong Kong Federation of Students.

DJ Giggs (21 November 2020) 
Edmund Wan Yiu-sing, better known as DJ 'Giggs', was a popular host at D100 Radio. In February 2020 he started the "Thousand Parents, Taiwan Aid" programme to help protesters exiled to Taiwan.

On 21 November 2020, Giggs, his wife Tsang Bik-wan, and his secretary Alice Lee Po-lai were arrested, accused of "providing financial assistance for secession" and money-laundering. The three were granted bail a day later, and were not charged. Three more, aged between 28 and 58, were arrested for the same accusation in connection with this case, which was only announced after media inquiries.

Giggs was arrested again on 7 February 2021 and charged the next day on suspicion of four counts of performing acts with seditious intention the next day, reportedly over his comments on air regarding his crowdfunding efforts. He was denied bail by judges and hence he remained in custody. He faced six new charges on 10 May 2021, of which five were additional ones for money laundering, and one was an additional one for conspiring to commit an act with a seditious intention. In a written statement, the judge described the contact of Giggs with two Taiwanese organisations, Judicial Reform Foundation and Presbyterian Church in Taiwan, as "very active". Alice Lee was charged with two counts of money-laundering but released on bail.

On 1 September 2022, Giggs pleaded guilty on three money-laundering charges and one count of sedition; as per a plea agreement with prosecution that had been revealed in May, six other charges were kept on file. Alice Lee had her charges kept on file as part of the plea agreement. On 7 October, Giggs was sentenced to 2 years and 8 months in prison.

CUHK congregation (7 December 2020) 

The 88th congregation ceremony of Chinese University of Hong Kong was planned to be held on 19 November 2020, but was changed to online due to the COVID-19 pandemic. Students and protesters, nevertheless, rallied in the university on the day, chanting Glory to Hong Kong, showing or graffitiing Liberate Hong Kong or independence slogans on the campus. 

On 7 December 2020, eight were arrested in a police operation for unlawful assembly, reportedly including three students, as well as district councillors und CUHK graduates Issac Lee and Eason Chan. Three of the group were accused of inciting secession. Police had based its operation on the examination of video footage on the day following the rally, reportedly with the agreement of university management. On 18 February 2021, another CUHK student, a male, was arrested for inciting secession. 

On 2 March 2022, more than a year after the congregation, the National Security Department charged two with "conspiracy to publish seditious words", including one currently serving jail term. One was granted bail in April.

On 2 November 2022, the prosecutors dropped the sedition charge but added a new charge of unlawful assembly, which carries a heavier jail term. Tong pleaded guilty to the new accusation, and was sentenced to up to three years at a correctional facility on 23 November.

2021 cases

Hong Kong 47 (6 January 2021) 

Following the landslide win in the 2019 local elections, the pro-democracy camp aimed to win a majority in the Legislative Council through primaries and tactical voting, as the general election was expected to be held in September 2020, in order to force the government to accept the five demands proposed during protests. Benny Tai, former associate professor of law at the University of Hong Kong, wrote an article in April 2020 titled "10 Steps to Laam Chau – The Fate of Hong Kong", detailing the plan which could force the dissolution the Legislative Council and the resignation of Chief Executive, or else result in more violent clashes and foreign sanctions.

The unprecedented arrest operation by the National Security Department of the police force started in the early morning on 6 January 2021. 55 were arrested in connection with the primaries, including Joshua Wong and Tam Tak-chi, who were arrested in prison or jail as they were serving sentences for protest or remanding in custody for sedition case respectively. Sunny Cheung and Ted Hui self-exiled in 2020 and therefore were not arrested despite participating in the primaries. The NSD regarded Tai's article as the core of attempting to subvert state power. All but Wong and Tam, and Wu Chi-wai who was found to not have declared a foreign passport in relation to another case, were released on bail by 8January.

On 28 February 2021, 47 of those 55 were charged with "conspiracy to subvert the state power", and were brought to court on the next day. The Magistrates' Court, for the first time, took four days to consider bail applications. Chief Magistrate Victor So let 15 be bailed out, but was immediately challenged by the Department of Justice (DOJ), hence all defendants had to stay behind bars. When the trial began in February 2023, only 13 defendants out of 47 were bailed out. Many quit their affiliated political parties and announced their retirement from politics. Owen Chow was re-arrested and remanded in January 2022 for breaching bail agreements, followed by Winnie Yu's bail being revoked in March 2022.

In the table below, Benny Tai, Au Nok-hin, Andrew Chiu, Ben Chung, Gordon Ng, John Clancey (U.S.-born lawyer) are regarded as the co-initiators of the primaries, or responsible for organising so. 

The restriction on reports of bail proceedings, stipulated in Section 9P of Criminal Procedure Ordinance and 87A of Magistrates Ordinance, was another controversy regarding National Security cases; a request by Gwyneth Ho to lift restrictions was turned down by the judge in September 2021, after which Ho instructed her lawyer to withdraw her bail application. The reporting ban was finally lifted on 18 August 2022 on request by Ho and three other defendants, after the verdict by the High Court over the Hong Kong Alliance case. The media then revealed 29 defendants are to plead guilty to the charges, while the other 17 are to stand trial in the High Court, namely Gwyneth Ho, Owen Chow, Ray Chan, Lam Cheuk-ting, Leung Kwok-hung, Ricky Or, Mike Lam, Lee Yue-shun, Winnie Yu, Michael Pang, Kalvin Ho, Lawrence Lau, Helena Wong, Sze Tak-loy, Ng Kin-wai. 11 of those were amongst the 13 bailed out. 

The trial is also the second national security case to be handled without a jury, after Paul Lam, Secretary for Justice, citing the "involvement of foreign elements", "personal safety of jurors and their family members", and a “risk of perverting the course of justice if the trial is conducted with a jury”.

The prosecution is led by Jonathan Man Tak-ho and Anthony Chau.

Returning Valiant (5 May 2021) 

On 5 May 2021, four students (Lai Chun-hei, Yuen Ka-him, Chan Ching-hing, Choi Wing-kit) were reportedly arrested on location after sneaking into Po Leung Kuk Laws Foundation College, a secondary school in Tseung Kwan O. Police, during the search, discovered some belonged to Returning Valiant and had hid independence slogans at home, including former spokesman Yuen Ka-him. All were charged with housebreaking later and bailed out. The NSD arrested a total of seven individuals on 5 and 6 May, five were accused of subversion but were not indicted.

On 5 July 2021, nine members of Returning Valiant were arrested for alleged terrorist activities, six of whom were secondary school students. The NSD said the arrested had attempted to plant car bombs, attack cross-harbour tunnels, railways, court buildings, and public facilities across the city, using TATP; in a raid at a hostel in Tsim Sha Tsui, police had confiscated laboratory equipment for making that highly explosive substance. Three (Ho Yu-wang, Alexander Au Man, Chan Cheuk-hin) were charged, brought to court, and denied bail on 7 July. Others were granted bail by police. Five more were arrested on 12 July, and three (Kwok Man-hei, Chan Hoi-leung, Law Kai-wing) were charged on 14 July; they were remanded in custody, with their trial adjourned to 1 September. One more person (So Wing-ching) was charged with terrorist activities on 1 September.

On 28 September 2021, seven were arrested by the NSD and charged with conspiracy to incite subversion of state power. At least 22 arrests had been made in relation to the case by the end of 2021. In late December 2021, Tseung Chau was granted bail under a list of conditions.   

All seven pleaded guilty to subversion, including four minors. On 8October 2022, five were sentenced to time in a training centre, where the period of detention ranges from six months to three years, making the four minors the first ones sentenced under the national security law.

For the housebreaking case, Lai Chun-hei, who had earlier pleaded guilty to assaulting a police officer, and Chan Ching-hing were both convicted by court on 9February 2023. Yuen Ka-him and Choi Wing-kit, both accused of subversion, pleaded guilty respectively to possession of an apparatus for radiocommunications without licence and of offensive weapons. Yuen's charge of housebreaking and Choi's charge of possession of child pornography were kept on file. Choi Wing-kit and Chan Yau-tsun were respectively jailed for five years and three months, and five years, for conspiracy to incite subversion, the extra three months for Choi being due to the weapons found at his home. Both appealed their sentence in order to obtain a one-third reduction for their guilty pleas. The reduction had been denied to them by the judge on the grounds of five years being the minimum term for offences of a "serious nature". The two lodged their appeal, which became public in February 2023, after another arrestee, Lui Sai-yu, had done so in a different national security case.

The prosecution was represented by Stella Lo.

Publications (6 June 2021) 

The National Security Department, on 6 June 2021, arrested a 45-year-old female clerk in Western District and a 17-year-old male secondary student in Sham Shui Po for allegedly having conspired between May and December 2020 to make and spread leaflets supporting Hong Kong independence, and which called for resisting "communisation". The duo was charged with "conspiracy to print, publish, distribute, display or reproduce seditious publications" on 8 June 2021, and remanded in custody. In August 2021 the male youth was given bail while the clerk remained behind bars, eventually being refused bail seven times. The two defendants agreed to plead guilty to the charges. The female clerk was jailed for 13.5months on 31 January 2022, while the secondary student was sent to 9months in a training centre.

Publications (21 June 2021) 

A 40-year-old male and a 36-year-old female were arrested on 21 and 25 June 2021, after displaying a flag showing the words "Liberate Hong Kong, revolution of our times" in a Mongkok Tong lau. Another 37-year-old male was arrested in Shaukeiwan after posting "Liberate Hong Kong, revolution of our times" fai chun and stickers on the door of the flat. All three were accused of seditious words or seditious intention, and were granted bail without being charged.

General Union of Speech Therapists (22 July 2021) 
The General Union of Hong Kong Speech Therapists was formed in November 2019 at the height of protests. The Union published three cartoon books surrounding wolves and sheep, named Guardians of the Sheep Village, 12 Warriors of the Sheep Village, and Dustman of the Sheep Village. The cartoon books, hinting political implications, were based on the 2019 protest, detainment of 12 Hongkongers, and the strike by medical workers at the beginning of COVID-19 pandemic.

Following condemnation by pro-Beijing camp and government officials, five from the General Union, three women and two men, were arrested on 22 July 2021, accused of violating the NSL. The NSD froze their assets amounting to around 160,000 HKD. Chairwoman Lai Man-ling and deputy chairwoman Melody Yeung were charged with seditious publication a day later, and denied bail. On 30 August, the remaining three bailed-out executives of the General Union, Secretary Sidney Ng, Treasurer Samuel Chan, and Fong Tsz-ho, were re-arrested and faced the same charge. All five were denied bail by the judges. In August 2021 the government announced that it would revoke the registration of the Union, which it carried through.

Sidney Ng later sought leave at the Court of Final Appeal to challenge the bail denial, arguing that the strict bail requirement shall not be applicable to non-NSL offences, only to be rejected in December 2021 as the court considered sedition is inevitably endangering National Security, and all offences possible to harm so shall subject to the bail threshold under the NSL.

All five defendants were found guilty of sedition charge on 7 September 2022, and they were sentenced to 19 months in prison on 10 September 2022.

Publications (6 August 2021) 
On 6 August 2021, police arrested a 41-year-old property manager, Chiang Chung-sang, who appeared at West Kowloon Magistrates' Courts on 9August. He was accused of having displayed seditious posters, and denied bail. On 26 January 2022, Chiang pleaded guilty to five out of eight counts of displaying and possessing physical and digital seditious publication, in reference to posters he had allegedly put up near a kindergarten in Tin Shui Wai and the High Court Building in June 2021, and 48 digital posters that had been found in his possession, which had been deemed of seditious nature and which contained words including, "police are Hong Kong’s largest criminal organisation." The judge said that the placement of the posters near the kindergarten would "poison [the children’s] hearts without their knowing", while the High Court posters would be a "challenge to the rule of law". On 31 January 2022 Chiang was sentenced to eight months in jail, the remaining three charges having been withdrawn by prosecutors according to local media.

HKUSU Council (18 August 2021) 

On 7 July 2021, the Hong Kong University Students' Union (HKUSU) Council passed a motion with 30 ayes, 2 abstentions, and no objection, that reads "the Union Council expresses its deep sadness at the death of Mr Leung Kin-fai; offers its sympathy and condolences to his family and friends; appreciates his sacrifice to Hong Kong" following the suicidal police stabbing by Leung on 1 July. The resolution soon met criticism and condemnation by the university, police, and Chief Executive for praising "terrorism", as what the government declared the suicidal attack was. Under pressure, all Union Executives along with many councillors resigned on 9 July, and revoked the motion. The university announced on 13 July that the Union would from that day no longer be recognised on campus. Three days later, the NSD entered the Union Building in HKU for case investigation. All students involved in the 7 July meeting were denied access to campus from 4 August.

On 18 August, the NSD arrested four HKU students (Kinson Cheung, chairman of HKUSU Council; Charles Kwok, former chairperson of HKUSU; Chris Todorovski, former student residence representative; and former Faculty of Arts representative Anthony Yung) for proposing, seconding, and voicing out support for the motion. The students were charged with advocating terrorism on the next day. Yung was granted bail on 27 August, and the other three defendants were bailed out on 24 September, marking the first time that all defendants in an NSL case had obtained bail. HKU students voted on the motion were invited to assist investigation in August 2021.

Hong Kong Alliance (8 September 2021) 

The Hong Kong Alliance in Support of Patriotic Democratic Movements of China, founded in the spring of 1989 to support democratic and labour movements in mainland China, was best known for organising annual memorial vigils for the victims of the 1989 Tiananmen Square protests and massacre. Its stated goals included ending one-party dictatorship. 

In 2020, the police banned the vigil for the first time, citing the ongoing anti-pandemic restrictions but at the time when the NSL was about to decree. Many still joined the vigil, including 26 leading democrats, who would be arrested and charged later. Following the imposition of the NSL, pro-Beijing camp reaffirmed the attack against the Alliance for breaching the Law. The pressure surged in mid-June 2021, days after the banned 2021 vigil, after Luo Huining, director of the Hong Kong Liaison Office of the Chinese Government, said the call for ending one-party dictatorship undermines the basis of "one country, two systems", without naming the Alliance.

On 25 August, standing committee members of the Alliance received letters from the NSD which, under power conferred by the Implementation Rules for Article 43 of the NSL, asked the Hong Kong Alliance to provide information for investigation, stating that the police commissioner had "sufficient reasons" to believe that the Alliance was acting on behalf of foreign entities. In a rebuttal letter which the Alliance handed in to police on 7September, it rejected the claims and declined to provide information. Officials soon warned the activists of the legal consequences.

On 8 and 9September 2021, vice-chairwoman Chow Hang-tung, and four other standing committee members, Simon Leung Kam-wai, Tsui Hon-kwong, Tang Ngok-kwan and Chan To-wai, were arrested for failing to provide information. The premises of the Alliance and the June 4th Museum were raided by police on 9September. Later in the evening, the Hong Kong Alliance, chairman Lee Cheuk-yan, vice-chairman Albert Ho and Chow Hang-tung were charged with inciting subversion; Chow and the other four committee members faced an additional offence of failing to provide information. Bails were all denied, but restrictions on reporting were relaxed. The Alliance approved dissolution on 25 September and began the liquidation, but their property were frozen by the NSD four days later, obstructing the liquidation.

On 22 October, the judge approved bail applications by all, consider the time they remanded in custody could exceed the highest possible penalty. Chow and Leung attempted to refuse bail to avoid restrictions on free speech, but were rejected by the magistrate. Leung pleaded guilty on 22 December, with the judge asking Leung's representative to confirm the plea and thus proving that Leung had not done so under duress, and was imprisoned for 3 months. Chan pleaded guilty on 10 May 2022 and was imprisoned for 3 months.

The Alliance, before liquidation procedures were completed, were struck off from the Companies Registry through an order from Chief Executive Carrie Lam on 26 October. The government announcement stated that the five operational goals of the Alliance amounted to "subverting state power".

In April 2022, a magistrate rejected an application by Chow to have reporting restrictions on her committal proceedings lifted. A judicial review of the decision that Chow had requested in May at the High Court was successful: in what was considered a landmark decision that could extend to cases under the NSL, the court ruled on 2 August 2022 that the restriction on media reporting had to be lifted. The ban in Chow's case was lifted on 17 August, marking the first amongst the national security cases. Albert Ho was granted bail on 22 August.

Student Politicism (20 September 2021) 

Student Politicism, a localist student activism group, was formed in May 2020. The group set up street booths to raise public awareness on various social and political issues. Police arrested their members for multiple times between September 2020 and July 2021, with accusations ranging from misconduct in public places, refusing police order, promoting an unauthorized assembly, to distributing seditious publications. Wong Yat-chin, convenor of the group and one of the last well-known remaining activists in Hong Kong not charged by authorities, was warned by these of violating the NSL. 

On 20 September 2021, convenor Wong Yat-chin, secretary-general Chan Chi-sum, and former spokeswoman Jessica Chu were arrested by the national security unit of the police, for allegedly inciting subversion, as per local news reports. A storage unit of Student Politicism in Kwai Chung was also raided. According to photos appearing in local media, books, face masks, chocolate and biscuits were among the items seized. Bails were denied after being brought to court. Spokesperson Wong Yuen-lam surrendered to police on 22 September, and was also charged. Student Politicism announced disbandment on 24 September. Only Chu was eventually granted bail, which she however asked to be revoked in July 2022.

On 23 October 2022, Wong Yat-chin, Chan Chi-sum and Jessica Chu were sentenced to 30 to 36 months in prison, while Wong Yuen-lam was sent to a training centre.

Online posts (11 November 2021) 
Police announced on 12 November 2021 that they had made an arrest in Sha Tin the previous day under the colonial-era Crimes Ordinance. The arrested, a 26-year-old male surnamed Chui who had formerly served in the police force, was charged with acting with "seditious intent" through posts on the Facebook page of the police, and that of himself, with an alleged intent to "incite hatred" against the government and "raise discontent" among the population of Hong Kong. Police said that the posts in question were in relation to the death of Lam Yuen-yee, a marine police officer, during an anti-smuggling operation in September 2021. Chui was released on bail.  He was convicted of sedition on 27 February 2023.

Online posts (16 December 2021) 
On 16 December 2021, 22-year-old Chan Tai-sum was arrested over allegedly seditious comments on LIHKG, an online forum, and on Telegram. Chan was charged with one count of inciting unlawful assemblies to be held on Christmas Eve in Causeway Bay and Yau Tsim Mong, and six counts of actions with seditious intent on 18 December, with bail denied. Chan eventually faced three charges over sedition. Four more were arrested on 23 December for inciting unlawful assemblies, criminal damage and with intention to cause grievous bodily harm, over urging for a "Christmas Eve revolution" via Facebook and Telegram.

The lawyer representing Chan disputed the legality of the District Court to hear sedition cases, arguing the charge was exempt from a rule stating that "indictable offences" were to be transferred to the District Court on request of the prosecution, and demanded the trial be stood in High Court with jury. The application was denied by the judge in District Court, who ruled that while the offence of sedition was a summary offence, it could be transferred to the District Court together with the indictable offence of taking part in an illegal assembly. Chan pleaded guilty in October 2022 and was sentenced to 12 months in prison in November 2022.

Stand News (29 December 2021) 

Stand News, founded in December 2014, was a long-time pro-democracy online media outlet. It gained prominence during the 2019–2020 Hong Kong protests for its frontline reporting and livestreaming, earning a top rating in credibility among ten online media outlets in 2019. The pro-Beijing camp condemned Stand News as promoting fake news and harming National Security. After Apple Daily ceased operation, Stand News, in June 2021, deleted posts from bloggers and readers. Six also resigned from the board of directors. On 3 December, Chris Tang, Secretary of Security, sharply criticised the reporting by Stand News the "smart prison" of Tai Tam Gap Correctional Institution. Stand News rejected Tang's claims.

On 29 December 2021, the NSD arrested six current and former executives of Stand News for suspected conspiracy to publish seditious publications. The arrested were former editor-in-chief Chung Pui-kuen, acting editor-in-chief Patrick Lam, former director Chow Tat-chi, Margaret Ng, Christine Fang, and Denise Ho. HKJA chairperson Ronson Chan, who was a deputy assignment editor at Stand News, was taken by police for assisting in the probe but not arrested. Chung's wife, Chan Pui-man, was re-arrested in jail. Lam reportedly resigned as chief editor immediately after the arrest. Former director Joseph Lin, and co-founders of the news outlet Yu Ka-fai, Tony Choi, were reportedly wanted by the police.

Hours after the arrest, Stand News announced its shutdown. Its website and most of its social media feeds and websites vanished after 11 pm. Its British bureau disbanded the next day.

Chung, Lam, and Best Pencil (Hong Kong) Limited, the owner of Stand News, were charged with seditious publication on 30 December. The four others were released on police bail. Bails were denied for both Chung and Lam. Police froze HK$61 million (US$7.8 million) of Stand News' assets.

On 11 April 2022, veteran journalist Allan Au was arrested in Kwai Chung by the NSD for allegedly, as per a press release by police on the same day which did not name Au, conspiring to publish seditious materials. Local reports said the arrest was related to the Stand News case. A professional consultant at the School of Journalism of the Chinese University at the time of the arrest, Au had worked at TVB News and RTHK, and was a columnist for outlets including Stand News and Ming Pao. Au was released on bail the following day and was not charged.

On 7 November, Lam was released on bail, after a lawyer for him and Chung applied for the termination of their sedition trial. On 13 December, Chung was also released on bail, after he was unable to review all of the new material from remand.

The lead prosecutor in the case is Laura Ng, who was criticized by the defence for submitting four new boxes of materials in February 2023.

2022 cases

Koo Sze-yiu (4 February 2022) 

Koo Sze-yiu, 75-year-old veteran activist who had been jailed at least 11times since 2000, was arrested by the NSD at his home in Sham Shui Po for inciting subversion on 4 February 2022, ahead of his planned protest against the Beijing Winter Olympics. Four more were brought to the police station to assist with the investigation: activists Lui Yuk-lin and Chan Yi-ming, former Democratic Party member Virginia Fung King-Man, and former vice-chairman of the Chinese Labour Party, Chan King-chung.

Koo was charged with attempting to commit seditious act on the next day, with bail denied. He was found guilty of sedition charge and sentenced to 9 months in prison on 12 July 2022.

Tommy Yuen (15 February 2022) 

On 15 February 2022, the NSD unit of the police arrested two men, aged 41 and 20, who were reported as singer and unemployed respectively, in Sha Tin and Tin Shui Wai. Among them, the 41-year-old man was charged with sedition and money laundering, while the 20-year-old man was arrested on suspicion of money laundering. After the police conducted a house search, they seized bank cards and records to prove the crime of money laundering. Police also froze about 140,000Hong Kong dollars in assets. The 41-year-old man was later identified as pro-democracy singer, Tommy Yuen, and the other arrestee as his former brother-in-law, Wong Tin-ho. Yuen was accused of posting inflammatory behaviors on Facebook and Instagram, with an aim to incite hatred against the government and the judiciary, and stoking discontent among Hong Kong citizens.     

On 17 February, Yuen was formally charged with one count of "doing an act or acts with seditious intention" under the colonial-era sedition law, and appeared in the West Kowloon Magistrates' Court in the afternoon.
The two men were at this point not yet formally charged with money laundering. The charge alleged that between 26 September 2021 and 21 January 2022, he made statements on his Facebook and Instagram account with the seditious intent to inciting hatred or contempt against Hong Kong government. Yuen was charged on 7 June with "inciting hatred against the government" and "fraud". He was denied bail for a third time on 3 November 2022. At the court session on 2 February 2023, the prosecution applied for the fraud charge to be amended to "dealing with property known or believed to represent proceeds of an indictable offence"; Yuen did not apply for bail, and indicated through his lawyer that he intended to plead guilty to the sedition charge and to money-laundering. The plea deal was to be confirmed at the time of the next court session on 25 July.

Ascohesion Cheese Tea (24 February 2022) 
Ascohesion Cheese Tea, a Mongkok bubble tea beverage shop which supported the pro-democracy movement, was targeted on 24 February 2022. One of the two owners was arrested at the shop, and the other in Tsuen Wan, by the NSD for seditious behavior after posting anti-vaccination messages online. Officers seized promotional stickers that contained slogans such as "reject digital surveillance" and "boycott LeaveHomeSafe." The shop has been posting anti-government and anti-police messages since its launch in October 2020, including a post in February 2022 which reads: "Omicron has already turned into a flu... countries around the world have already scrapped anti-epidemic mechanisms and also called on students not to take the jabs as no vaccines can prevent infection." Other posts claimed the government is insistent on launching a health code so that it can collect residents' personal information as "revenge" for the 2019 protest, and advised students to "pretend they are ill as a side effect of vaccination".

The duo was charged with "doing an act or acts with seditious intention" on the next day. Both were denied bail. After pleading guilty, Hau and Lam were jailed for 7 and 6 months.

Martial club (21 March 2022) 
A 59-year-old male combat coach and his 62-year-old female assistant of a martial club were arrested by NSD police on 21 March 2022 for alleged “acts with seditious intention,” and have been detained for investigation. Posters allegedly “incited hate”, electronic communication devices reportedly used to distribute seditious messages, and weapons were found. The following day, senior superintendent Steve Li of the NSD accused the two of having spread seditious speech on social media since March 2020, and that some recent messages had sought to resist government efforts to encourage COVID-19 vaccine uptake, such as through claiming that vaccination would create harmful toxins. Police also seized cash, mostly in foreign currency, to the amount of 380,000 Hong Kong dollars, leaflets, and posters which it said were linked to the anti-extradition bill protests in 2019. The NSD said the duo were planning to “build an army", with the posts involved inciting others to use force to overturn the regime and inviting netizens to practise martial arts "in preparation for a future revolution and resisting the regime." The NSD was also discussing with the Department of Justice about adding charges under the NSL as the pair's alleged offences "far superseded seditious acts".

The pair were charged with acting with seditious intent, possessing offensive weapons with intent and possessing arms without a licence. They were denied bail pending trial.

On 22 and 23 June 2022, three men were arrested for sedition in relation to the martial arts club case; a "large number of weapons" including machetes, knives and swords was seized at their homes, as per a police announcement. The three were not brought to court for trial.

Denis Wong's sedition charge was upgraded to inciting subversion under the NSL on 5 September.

The prosecutor, Vincent Lee Ting-wai, said that Wong's posts had incited others to learn how to use weapons, and said "he aimed at recruiting students with the ultimate purpose of overthrowing the government."

On 3 February 2023, Wong and Cheung pleaded guilty to inciting subversion and weapon-related charges, while Cheung was released on bail. On 24 February, Wong was sentenced to 5 years in prison, while Cheung was sentenced to 16 months in prison.

Court listeners (6 April 2022) 

With many protestors brought to trial in court after being arrested, a group of "court listeners" was formed to attend court hearings and show the support to those arrested.

On 6 April 2022, six were arrested under the sedition law on suspicion of causing nuisance during hearings seriously and affecting the solemnity of the judiciary at the High Court, West Kowloon Magistrates’ Courts and Eastern Magistrates’ Courts between December 2021 and January 2022, including a court hearing when activist Chow Hang-tung was found guilty of incitement over the 2021 commemoration of the Tiananmen massacre. Leo Tang Kin-wah, former vice-chairman of the opposition-leaning Confederation of Trade Unions, was reportedly among the arrested, as was Siu Wan (Siew Yun-long), a citizen journalist. The arrested further included pastor Garry Pang, who, as stated by the prosecution, also ran a YouTube channel on 2019 protest-related trials, and a female surnamed Chiu; the two were charged for alleged sedition and remanded in custody, while the four others were released on bail.
Pang was additionally charged with performing "an act or acts of seditious intention" over his YouTube channel.

In early July 2022 Pang was denied bail at the High Court, for the third time according to local media, while Chiu was released after posting bail, vowing to report to a police station three times a week, and surrendering her travel documents. On 27 October 2022, Pang and Chiu were sentenced to one year and three months jail respectively, with Pang having been found guilty also of the charge relating to the YouTube videos. On 31 January 2023, Chiu withdrew her bail application as stated by her lawyer at the High Court that day. She commenced her sentence the same day.

612 Fund (10 May 2022) 

The 612 Humanitarian Relief Fund, which helped arrested protesters pay for their legal and medical bills, disbanded in 2021 after the NSD demanded it hand over operational details including information about its donors and beneficiaries. Hui Po-keung, a prominent cultural studies scholar who was also the trustee of the fund, was arrested for "collusion with foreign forces" on 10 May 2022 at the airport when he was on his way to take up an academic post in Europe. Other trustees including former MP Margaret Ng, singer Denise Ho, and the retired bishop of Hong Kong Cardinal Joseph Zen, were arrested on 11 May, just hours after news of Hui arrested came. Former MP Cyd Ho, then serving jail term, was arrested on 12 May. The Holy See expressed concern about Cardinal Zen's arrest, who is one of the most senior Catholic clerics in Asia. Foreign countries also voiced out concern regarding the arrest. The office-bearers of the 612 Fund, including Sze Shing-wai, were later charged with failing to register the fund as an organization with the police. All denied the charge and were not remanded awaiting trial for the court summon.

The lead prosecutor, Anthony Chau, said that the Societies Ordinance was enacted to protect national security and that requiring the Fund to register as a society did not infringe on freedom of association.

Sze was reportedly arrested at the airport on 5 November, also accused of collusion with foreign forces.

On 25 November, the five trustees were fined HK$4,000 (US$512) each, while Sze was fined HK$2,500 (US$320).

Weapon seizure (23 May 2022) 
On 23 May 2022, a 31-year-old man was arrested in a flat in Wong Tai Sin by the Cyber Security and Technology Crime Bureau of the Police Force, for allegedly inciting to cause grievous bodily harm, and making explosives. Police said on 24 May that they had become alerted through online messages by the suspect calling for attacks on police headquarters, and for intimidating messages targeting judges. A room in the flat had been converted to what police called a mini-laboratory; it seized about 20kilograms of chemicals there. A storage room in San Po Kong was also raided by police, where about a further 10kilograms of chemicals were found, which police said could have been used to make TATP and HMTD. His parents were also arrested by the following day. He was later brought to court and had bail denied. 

On 25 June 2022, two males aged 27 and 29 were arrested by the NSD for the same bomb suspicion as the May arrests; the earlier arrests had prompted police to look into whether the celebration of the 25th anniversary of the handover on 1 July could be a target of possible attacks.

Online posts (23 June 2022) 
Two men were arrested on 23 June 2022 and charged the same day with "committing an act or acts with seditious intent". The case alleges that between 17 January 2021 and 13 June 2022, Chan Kwun-yuk shared photos and posters on Instagram intending to stir up disaffection with and disobedience to the Hong Kong and mainland governments, and to incite violence; while Chan Wai-lun was accused of publishing or continuing to display statements on the LIHKG discussion forum from 1 July 2021 to 23 June 2022, to incite violence, and to stir up disobedience to the law. NSL-designated judge Peter Law denied bail to the two on 24 Junein one case, on the grounds that the defendant may continue to engage in acts endangering national security; in the other, as the national security bail threshold could not be satisfied. This application of NSL bail conditions was in spite of the charge of sedition falling under pre-NSL legislation. The two were remanded for hearing.

Both pleaded guilty to the charges, Chan Kwun-yuk was jailed for five months on 16 September while Chan Wai-lun was sentenced to 16 weeks in jail on 27 September 2022.

Weapon seizure (26 June 2022) 
Two men aged 31 and 53 were arrested on 26 June 2022 on suspicion of acting with seditious intention, possession of an imitation firearm and offensive weapon, and possession of an apparatus for radiocommunications without licence. Chen, the 53-year-old man, was charged with seditious intent, possession of offensive weapons, and possession of apparatus for radiocommunications without license, and brought to court on 28 June 2022.

Chen pleaded guilty to seditious intent and radio-related charges, and the prosecution withdrew a third charge, of possession of offensive weapons, as part of a plea bargain. He was sentenced to 4 months in prison on 15 September 2022.

Online posts (1 August 2022) 
Two men, both reportedly civil servants aged 34 and 36, were arrested on 1 August 2022 by the NSD under the sedition law on suspicion of publishing social media posts that were said to have promoted "feelings of ill-will and enmity between different classes of the population of Hong Kong and incite the use of violence". Media reported that the suspects made "anti-government" posts on platforms including Facebook and discussion forum LIHKG, and shared posts that promoted Hong Kong independence.

Police said the 36-year-old was also suspected of voyeurism and "publication of images originating from commission of voyeurism", after officers from the national security unit found he had taken indecent photos of an individual and shared them on social platforms.

The 34-year-old was charged with seditious intent on 3 August, and remanded in custody. He was sentenced to six months in prison on 25 October.

Civil Servants Secrets (9 August 2022) 
Two government workers were arrested on 9 August 2022 on suspicion of seditious intention by publishing posts on social media group to "disseminate seditious messages that promote feelings of ill-will and enmity between different classes of the population of Hong Kong". Media reported the arrestees were the managers of the Facebook page "Civil Servants Secrets", which was closed down after the arrest. The police also probed five others and arrested two of those for fraud.

On the day of the arrest, the Civil Servants Secrets Facebook page, which acted as a platform for anonymous submissions, became inaccessible. Other "secrets" pages closed down in the following days, including those for parents, medical workers, and universities.

Queen's funeral (19 September 2022) 

Thousands in Hong Kong paid tribute to Elizabeth II, the late Queen of the United Kingdom after her death on 8 September 2022, with queues seen outside the Consulate General of the United Kingdom every day until the funeral on 19 September. Later that night, according to police and local media, a harmonica player was arrested after playing several songs, including the British national anthem and Glory to Hong Kong, for committing "seditious acts".

Online posts (27 September 2022) 
Two men were arrested on 27 September 2022, suspected of publishing posts on social platforms to "disseminate seditious messages that promote feelings of ill-will and enmity between different classes of the population of Hong Kong and incite the use of violence". Media reported the men published content related to Hong Kong independence and included "one nation, one Hong Kong", "Liberate Hong Kong, revolution of our times".

On 29 September, they were each charged with one count of "doing an act or acts with seditious intention". In the case of Chui, the 18-year-old, this included pro-independence posts on LIHKG and Discord, while for Choi, it included posting pro-independence posts on LIHKG. Both were remanded in custody. The court was told that Choi called for the "execution" of "rogue" and "Nazist" judges and welcomed the United States to initiate a bombing attack on police and military premises in the city. Chui was further charged with insulting the national anthem by publishing altered lyrics and desecrating the national flag, for a total of four charges.

On 23 November, Chui pleaded guilty to all four charges, and was sentenced to a training centre on 13 December. On 16 December, Choi was sentenced to 8 months in prison.

Solidarity with Beijing Sitong Bridge protest (24 October 2022) 
A male engineer from mainland China, aged 27, was arrested on 24 October 2022 in Tseung Kwan O for seditious intent, according to police. A week earlier, police had received a report from the security unit of the Legislative Council about three posters found on a noticeboard on the LegCo premises. Police stated that the posters had related to mainland policies to contain the COVID-19 pandemic and could have provoked hatred or contempt against Chinese leader Xi Jinping, without elaborating.

Arson attack (26 October 2022) 
Hong Kong NSD arrested a 22-year-old man on suspicion of five charges: terrorism, arson, conspiracy to commit arson, conspiracy to defraud, and money laundering. He was accused of committing arson at a Tsuen Wan Covid-19 testing station in May 2021, planning to carry out an arson attack on a Covid-19 testing centre, and defrauding a bank. The man was believed to be a member of two anti-government groups, Returning Valiant and Black Bloc and suspected of providing financial support.

Six others have been arrested in connection with the offenses, including a 20-year-old man and a 52-year-old woman, both reportedly member of Black Bloc, for conspiracy to commit arson over the attempted arson attack. The remaining two men and two women, aged between 36 and 43, were suspected of conspiring to defraud a bank while applying for a loan and successfully obtained around HK$4.7 million.

Hong Kong Independence Party (1 November 2022) 

Joseph John, a 40-year-old man of Portuguese nationality, was arrested by the NSD on 1 November 2022 for allegedly posting seditious material, including urging the international community to send troops to Hong Kong and to crowdfund military spending, on the website of the Hong Kong Independence Party, to which he was alleged to belong by local media. John was reportedly arrested after arriving in Hong Kong to tend to an ill family member. He was then charged with act with sedition intention on 3 November and had his bail application denied by court. The charge was later upgraded to inciting secession in March 2023.

Online posts (3 November 2022) 
Five were arrested in May 2022 over messages in Telegram, accused of developing weapons and plotting to kill police officers. They were subsequently charged with conspiracy to cause grievous bodily harm and other offences. On 3 November, months after four had been remanded in custody, three of those each faced a new charge of seditious act, making this a national security case.

Online posts (21 November 2022) 
A 42-year-old man named Wong Chung-kit was arrested on 21 November 2022, suspected of publishing seditious messages, including thanking the South Korean government for recognising the "Hong Kong national anthem". He also allegedly shared a video of a recent South Korean Rugby Sevens game, when Glory to Hong Kong was played as Hong Kong's national anthem instead of the Chinese national anthem.

On 23 November, Wong was charged for doing an act or acts with seditious intention through social media posts on Facebook, Instagram and Twitter, between January 2021 and November 2022, and denied bail. On 5 January 2023, Wong was sentenced to eight months in prison. According to the judge, the posts had advocated for Hong Kong independence, encouraged others to use violencein particular with reference to the 1 July police stabbing, and encouraged others to counter anti-COVID-19 pandemic efforts by avoiding vaccination, not using the LeaveHomeSafe app, and not wearing a mask. The sentenced included a one-third deduction for his having pleaded guilty.

Online posts (12 December 2022) 
A man aged 49 was arrested in Aberdeen for sedition and doxxing after allegedly publishing social media posts which "insulted" the Chinese national anthem and disclosing the personal data of police officers and their family members without consent.

2023 cases

1 July stabbing commemoration (1 January 2023) 
A 22-year-old female, reportedly a law student at a local university from mainland China, was arrested in Causeway Bay on 1 January 2023 after placing candles, flowers, and pictures with allegedly "seditious" words paying, according to local media, tribute to Leung Kin-fai who stabbed a policeman in 2021. She was later released on police bail and required to report to police in mid-January.

Online posts (5 January 2023) 
On 5 January 2023, a 24-year-old male was arrested by national security police for alleged sedition over his social media posts, some of which called for Hong Kong independence.

Lunar New Year fair (17 January 2023) 
Six people were arrested by the NSD on 17 January 2023 over the production, publishing and sale of a "seditious" book on the 2019 protests. Officers from the NSD and Customs also raided a Lunar New Year fair at Ginza Plaza in Mongkok. Alan Keung, nicknamed "Pastor Keung", founder of independent news outlet Free HK Media, was among those arrested, according to local reports.

The police said the six, aged 18 to 62, were "members of an anti-government organisation", accusing them of producing and publishing a "seditious book about a series of riots that occurred in Hong Kong from June 2019 to February 2020". The police also claimed the products reportedly sold at Shame On You Grocery Store, "advocates for Hong Kong independence", "incites others to overthrow the central authorities and Hong Kong’s government", and "glorified violence or opposed the government".

Three of six were later charged with conspiracy to do an act or acts with seditious intention, and had their bail denied by court. On 20 March, Lee, Keung and Chan was sentenced to 5 months, 8 months and 10 months in prison, respectively.

Online posts (8 March 2023) 
A 23-year-old woman was arrested by the NSD on 8 March 2023 in Sau Mau Ping on suspicion of inciting secession by publishing online posts that incited Hong Kong independence.

Elizabeth Tang (9 March 2023) 
On 9 March 2023, Elizabeth Tang, general secretary of the International Domestic Workers Federation and former chief executive of pro-democracy Confederation of Trade Unions, was arrested by the NSD after visiting her imprisoned husband, former opposition lawmaker Lee Cheuk-yan, at Stanley Prison. The NSD said the 65-year-old was arrested for suspected collusion with a foreign country or external elements to endanger national security. The arrest was filmed exclusively by Beijing mouthpiece Wen Wei Po.

South China Morning Post reported Tang was the director of Asia Monitor Resource Centre, and suspected by another state-owned media Ta Kung Pao of receiving donations from groups in the United States, Germany and Norway since 1994 to support labour movements in Asia. The centre in 2021 dismissed Ta Kung Pao's report as a "false accusation" and stressed the centre is "independent of any local or international organisations”.

Reports said Tang had only returned to the city recently to visit injured Lee, after leaving for Britain in 2021 when the centre announced dissolution over "intensified" pressure.

On 11 March, the NSD arrested Marilyn Tang, the younger sister of Elizabeth Tang, and Frederick Ho, younger brother of opposition veteran Albert Ho on suspicion of conspiracy to pervert the course of justice, after Elizabeth Tang was released on police bail. Media reports said the duo were detained for questioning after officers suspected they had taken evidence related to allegations that Elizabeth Tang violated the NSL. They were released on bail.

Possessing publication (14 March 2023) 
Two males aged 38 and 50 were arrested on 13 March 2023 under the sedition law, according to police and local media reports. Police said the publications were capable of "incited hatred or contempt" against the Chinese and Hong Kong governments and the judiciary and "were also capable of inciting others to use violence or disobey the law". Two local news outlets reported that the books in question were children's books about sheep and wolves that had led to sedition convictions in a high-profile trial in 2022. Ming Pao reported the publications were sent from Britain to Hong Kong. In 2021, at the arrests that led to the 2022 trial, police had warned parents to destroy copies of the books, while a senior national security police official said he "should not pose a problem" with merely possessing those publications. The police now said the possession of seditious publications was "a serious crime". Hong Kong legal scholar Johannes Chan said the arrests highlighted the vagueness of sedition charges.

Wanted activists

List on 31 July 2020 
Chinese state television CCTV reported on 31 July 2020 that Hong Kong police had issued arrest warrants for six fugitive activists who were suspected of violating the NSL, namely pro-democracy camp's Nathan Law, Simon Cheng, Samuel Chu; localist Ray Wong; pro-independence Wayne Chan and Honcques Laus. Hong Kong police declined to comment.

Wayne Chan and Ray Wong were facing charges before their exile, while Nathan Law was put on the wanted list by police after he had, without facing charges, left Hong Kong. Samuel Chu appeared to be the first non-Hong Kong citizen wanted under the NSL.

Details of wanted individuals:

 Nathan Law: former Legislative Council member; charged with unlawful assembly for 2020 Tiananmen vigil; self-exile to Britain and granted political asylum.
 Wayne Chan: leader of Hong Kong Independence Union; charged with unlawful assembly for 9 June 2020 march; possibly self-exile to the Netherlands.
 Simon Cheng: staff at British Consulate-General in Hong Kong; disappeared in China in August 2019 after claims of forced arrest; self-exile to Britain and granted political asylum.
 Ray Wong: co-founder of Hong Kong Indigenous; charged with riot for 2016 Mongkok unrest; self-exile to Germany in 2018 and revealed a year later.
 Honcques Laus: chairperson of Hongkonger Utilitarian Party; self-exile to Britain before the imposition of the NSL.
 Samuel Chu: founder of Hong Kong Democracy Council

List on 27 December 2020 
The South China Morning Post reported on 27 December 2020 that according to an unnamed insider of the police force, about 30 Hongkongers abroad were wanted by the National Security Department. Four exiled activists were named: Ted Hui, Sunny Cheung, Baggio Leung, and Brian Leung.

Details of named wanted individuals:

 Ted Hui: former member of Legislative Council; pro-democracy primaries candidate; charged with nine offences including scuffles during National Anthem Ordinance voting; arrested during protest; with travel documents not confiscated, court approved his departure for Denmark on 30 November 2020 over an invitation from local MP; announced exile soon afterwards; currently self-exile in Australia
 Sunny Cheung: pro-democracy primaries candidate; wanted by court after missing trial for unlawful assembly in 2020 Tiananmen vigil
 Baggio Leung: former member of Legislative Council; found guilty and jailed for 4 months over unlawful assembly in parliament during oath-taking controversy; exiled to United States in November 2020 after released from prison
 Brian Leung: read out Declaration of Hong Kong Protesters when Legislative Council Complex was occupied by protesters; left Hong Kong and was wanted by court after absence in riot trial;  he was studying for a doctorate in political science at the University of Washington.

Hong Kong Parliament 
Overseas activists, including businessman and commentator Elmer Yuen, journalist Victor Ho, and ex-MP Baggio Leung, who launched a committee to establish a "Hong Kong Parliament" in exile were accused of subversion by Hong Kong's Security Bureau. The Bureau said the police "would spare no efforts" in accordance with national security legislation, "in order to bring the offenders to justice".

The Hong Kong Parliament Electoral Organizing Committee, based in Toronto, Canada, was launched in July 2022, aiming to hold the first election of the parliament in late 2023, with a spokesperson saying that the vote would be held "globally" and online.

Other cases

Paul Harris (1 March 2022) 
Paul Harris, ex-chairman of the Hong Kong Bar Association, whose pro-democracy stance had attracted criticism from Chinese and Hong Kong authorities as well as attacks by state-backed media during his year-long term, met the national security police on 1 March 2022 to assist with an investigation, and was asked to explain acts that had allegedly violated the NSL. According to HK01, the meeting was related to NGO Hong Kong Human Rights Monitor, of which Harris is the founding chairperson. Harris was not arrested and left Hong Kong for his home country of the United Kingdom just hours after the meeting.

Hong Kong Watch (14 March 2022) 

Hong Kong Watch, a UK-based human rights organisation, was accused by the NSD of colluding with foreign forces, and threatened Benedict Rogers, founder of the NGO, could face imprisonment. The NSD said in the letter that acts, including "lobbying foreign countries to impose sanctions" and "seriously disrupting the formulation and implementation of laws" by the Hong Kong and Chinese Government, constitute collusion offence. Since mid-February Hong Kong Watch's website has not been accessible in Hong Kong without using a VPN. This was the first time a foreign advocacy group was confirming being formally accused of breaching the NSL. Foreign Secretary of the UK Liz Truss said in a statement the "unjustifiable action" was "clearly an attempt to silence those who stand up for human rights in Hong Kong".

HKCTU raid (31 March 2022) 

The Hong Kong Confederation of Trade Unions, a pro-democracy union coalition disbanded in October 2021, was raided and four former leaders were brought in for questioning by the NSD, including Lee Cheuk-yan, former MP jailed for illegal assembly. Media reports said the union had allegedly refused to comply with a police request for information based on the Societies Ordinance. They said the force had applied for warrants to search premises related to the organisation.

Handover anniversary (1 July 2022) 
Amid the anniversary of Hong Kong handover and the planned visit by Xi Jinping, the NSD arrested nine people in the week before 1 July. The political sensitivity was unprecedentedly high before the day. The NSD met several pro-democracy groups, including the League of Social Democrats (LSD) on 28 June, which then announced not to hold any protest on 1 July, the first time in 25 years since Hong Kong was placed under Chinese rule. Nevertheless, the NSD still searched the homes of Raphael Wong, chairman of LSD, and six other LSD members were watched and followed by the NSD. Secretary-general Avery Ng wrote on 29 June that he was "imprisoned", without giving further details but stating later that he was not under house arrest. The Hong Kong Public Opinion Research Institute delayed their announcement of polling result on the level of support rate of the government, which they said was "in response to suggestions from relevant government department(s) after their risk assessment". Local newspaper Ming Pao reported that the department in question was the NSD.

Notes

See also 

 Hong Kong Basic Law Article 23
 HKSAR v Lai Chee Ying
 Macau national security law
 National People's Congress decision on Hong Kong national security legislation
 National Security Law of the People's Republic of China
 National Security (Legislative Provisions) Bill 2003

References

External links 
 
 
 
 

2020 in Hong Kong
2021 in Hong Kong
 
Political repression in Hong Kong